Chechar is a district in Khenchela Province, Algeria. It was named after its capital, Chechar.

Municipalities
The district is further divided into four municipalities:
Chechar
Djellal 
Khirane
El Oueldja

Districts of Khenchela Province

Communes of Khenchela Province